Daniel A. Ivey-Soto is an American politician and a Democratic member of the New Mexico Senate representing District 15 since January 15, 2013.

Political career
2012: Incumbent District 15 Democratic Senator Tim Eichenberg was unopposed for the June 5, 2012 Democratic Primary; when Senator Eichenberg withdrew, Ivey-Soto replaced him on the November 6, 2012 General election ballot, winning with 10,927 votes (52.9%) against Republican nominee H. Diane Snyder.
1996: When House District 18 Representative Cisco McSorley ran for New Mexico Senate, Ivey-Soto ran in the four-way June 4, 1996 Democratic Primary but lost to Gail Beam; Beam went on to win the three-way November 5, 1996 General election.
In 2022, Ivey-Soto sought to remove automatic voter registration from a voting rights bill that Democratic New Mexico legislators were working on. Ivey-Soto argued that it was intrusive to automatically register voters. Ivey-Soto was also opposed to an Election Day holiday.

References

External links
Official page at the New Mexico Legislature

Daniel Ivey-Soto at Ballotpedia
Daniel A. Ivey-Soto at the National Institute on Money in State Politics

Place of birth missing (living people)
Year of birth missing (living people)
Living people
Democratic Party New Mexico state senators
Politicians from Albuquerque, New Mexico
21st-century American politicians